Lenie is a small hamlet consisting of Lower Lenie and Upper Lenie, situated on the northwestern shore of Loch Ness in Inverness-shire, Scottish Highlands and is in the Highland council area of Scotland.

Urquhart Castle, which sits on Strone Point, lies 2 km north east along the A82 road. Achnahannet lies just to the southwest.

Gallery

References

Populated places in Inverness committee area
Loch Ness